Kiely is an Irish surname. It is either the Anglicized form of Ó Cadhla or a variant of Keeley. Notable people with the surname are:

Benedict Kiely (1919–2007), Irish writer and broadcaster
Dan Kiely (Daniel Kiely; born 1940), Irish auctioneer and politician
David M. Kiely (born 1949), Irish writer
Dean Kiely (born 1970), English former footballer
Jerome Kiely (born 1925), Irish poet
John Kiely (disambiguation), several people
Kevin Kiely, Irish politician
Kevin Kiely (poet) (born 1953), Northern Irish poet
Larry Kiely (born 1941), Irish hurler
Laurence Kiely (born 1880), Irish Olympic hurdler
Len Kiely (Leonard Francis Kiely; born 1954), Australian politician
Leo Kiely (1929–1984), American baseball pitcher
Mark Kiely, American actor
Molly Kiely (born 1969), American cartoonist
Rory Kiely (1934–2018), Irish politician
Orla Kiely (born 1963), Irish fashion designer
Perri Kiely (born 1995), British street dancer
Sophia Kiely (born 2000), British stage actress 
Terry Kiely (born 1975), British actor
Tom Kiely (Thomas Francis Kiely; 1869–1951), Irish Olympic athlete
Paige Ackerson-Kiely (born 1975), American poet

References

Anglicised Irish-language surnames